The 1948–49 season was Galatasaray SK's 45th in existence and the club's 37th consecutive season in the Istanbul Football League.

Squad statistics

Competitions

Istanbul Football League

Classification

Results summary

Results by round

Matches
Kick-off listed in local time (EEST)

References
 1948-1949 İstanbul Futbol Ligi. Türk Futbol Tarihi vol.1. page(56). (June 1992) Türkiye Futbol Federasyonu Yayınları.

External links
 Galatasaray Sports Club Official Website 
 Turkish Football Federation - Galatasaray A.Ş. 
 uefa.com - Galatasaray AŞ

Galatasaray S.K. (football) seasons
Turkish football clubs 1948–49 season
1940s in Istanbul